John Hawksby is an English former professional footballer who played as a winger for Leeds United, Lincoln City, and York City in the 1960s.

Club career
Born York, Yorkshire, Hawksby made his debut for Leeds United, aged 18, in August 1960 and scored in each of his first two games, which were to be the only two goals that he scored for Leeds. He played for Leeds during an unsettled period for the club, including the 1961–62 season in which Leeds battled against relegation to the Third Division. His place in the team was taken by Albert Johanneson for the 1962–63 season and he made only nine further first team appearances before joining Lincoln City in August 1964. He then joined York City during the 1965–66 season.

International career
Hawksby was capped by the England national youth team in 1959 while a Leeds  player.

References
General

Specific

1942 births
Living people
Footballers from York
English footballers
England youth international footballers
Association football wingers
Leeds United F.C. players
Lincoln City F.C. players
York City F.C. players
English Football League players